Yevgeniy Kostyukevich (born 19 December 1989) is a Belarusian former professional footballer.

Career
Kostyukevich spent his youth years at Torpedo Zhodino and went on trial to CSKA Moscow in summer 2008. However, due to health issues discovered during the trial the contract was not signed. The same issues eventually forced him to end his career in late 2009. In summer 2015 Kostyukevich restarted his playing career at Krumkachy Minsk despite originally joining the team as goalkeeper coach and videographer.

References

External links 
 
 

1989 births
Living people
Belarusian footballers
Association football goalkeepers
FC Torpedo-BelAZ Zhodino players
FC Krumkachy Minsk players
People from Zhodzina
Sportspeople from Minsk Region